Hamfest India is a popular annual amateur radio event held in India, since 1991. The venue of an upcoming Hamfest India is decided by the General Body of the last Hamfest India. The event is an excellent occasion for Hams and SWLs to meet each other and to keep updated on latest developments. It usually has technical sessions, presentations, exhibitions, demonstrations, sales of radio equipment and a flea market. The event also propose to create more awareness on Ham Radio. ‘Hamfest India' is precisely the largest gathering of Indian HAMs in one place.

How it all began

The idea of a generally accepted yearly convention was conceived in the South and both the earliest of its kind were organised in Kerala. The story unfolds with the formation of 'All Kerala Amateur Radio Clubs' Coordination Committee' which was decided in a meeting of Amateur Radio operators from Kerala. The meeting was held at Kottayam on 15 July 1991. This was convened jointly by OM Dr Jayakumar VU2JKR, OM Sharma VU2LV and OM Natan VU2KGN. It was intended to discuss various issues regarding promotion of Amateur Radio in Kerala. The meeting appointed a three members ‘Kerala Amateur Radio Clubs Coordination Committee’, in which OM Joseph Mattappally VU2JIM, OM V A Joseph VU2JLX and OM K V Jose VU2JKV were members.

The Committee chose to bring all active Hams under one umbrella and on Sunday 11 August 1991, Hinet was launched. The Net frequency was 7065 KHz. and the timing was 8 AM to 8.30 AM on all Sundays. Joseph VU2JLX and Joseph VU2JIM controlled the Net. Gradually, Radio Round Tables on preselected technical topics, managed by OM Ravi VU2RDN, became the highlight of Hinets. It is what that later led to a live demo chain - Hamfest ‘91. Both HF’91 & HF’92 have greatly benefitted from the service of this vibrant veteran Ham, Ravi VU2RDN.

The idea of organizing a Hamfest, wherein HAMs and SWLs would come individually, irrespective of their club or society and collectively work with the spirit of the hobby was the result of Hinet activities. Before long, the Co-ordination Committee found that on-the-air interactions are not enough. So a get together was planned. Field days, at that time, were mostly limited to eyeballs, a few antenna/propagation experiments, some activity demos, food and chats. The idea was to share shack management techniques like PCB making, soldering, coil/transformer winding, modules assembling, mounting ICs, SWR matching, antenna designing, BFO tuning, operational etiquettes and much more…. After prolonged open discussions, Kerala Amateur Radio Clubs Coordination Committee, decided to make this a two days event and OM Joseph Mattappally VU2JIM was appointed to be the General Convener of it.

Hamfest ‘91 (Kuttikkanam)

The Hinet family could easily confirm the dates and location – 28 and 29 December 1991 at Government Guest House, Kuttikkanam. Kuttikkanam is a tourist hotspot aside a misty mountain plantation township in Idukki district, situated at an elevation of 3,500 feet above the sea level on Kollam–Theni National Highway, near Thekkady. Discussions went on for a befitting name for this event. A lot of proposals like ‘Home brewers’ Meet’ and ‘Hams’ Festival’ came up for deliberation. As the event closed in, the name became ‘Hamfest’ and finally ‘Hamfest 91’. Because of the initial overall limitations (esp. in camp capacity) and this being a typical fresh experiment, the committee accommodated only just 38 early registrants in the camp.

One of the decisions of the organizers was that the merits of this event should not be attributed to any single person or group; Hamfest ’91 wasn’t a one man/group show either. It was this general attitude that made Hamfest different. Still, Hams like Joseph VU2JLX, Ravi VU2RDN, Gopi VU2EGM and Mukund VU2DRL deserve special mention for their powerful involvement and support. Not only those who attended the Fest but many who could not attend the same also deserve to be appreciated for the encouragement the organizers received. Precisely, Hamfest was the result of the burning thirst of South Indian Amateur Radio enthusiasts to unite and grow.

It was this revived spirit of unity that actually served as the energy behind the success of Hamfest ‘91 and the force that paved the way to its transition into Hamfest India later.

The first Hamfest began with a welcome session in Pius 10th Higher Secondary School, Kuttikkanam at 11 AM on 28 December 1991. It was late OM Madhava Menon VU2MAH from Kollam, the oldest Ham present there, who presided over the welcome session. After the introductory session in the School hall, all moved to the Government Guest House. The whole team, as planned before, split into various groups, some demonstrating home brewing techniques, some exhibiting working models and some holding question-answer sessions. All the 38 participants who represented the South Indian States of Karnataka, Tamil Nadu and Kerala, joined together to share and learn new home brewing technologies. It was an unforgettable experience! During the closing session, none could hold their appreciation for the event. It was simple, elegant and well organized, where Hams came and joined on their own standing and collectively worked in the true spirit of the hobby.

The registrants were free to remit the amount of their choice towards expenses, thanks to Mukund VU2DRL Suresh VU2SUO and Mathew VU2MMA, Directors of Ham Radio Guild, who cleared all the remaining financial dues of Hamfest ‘91.

Everybody wanted this event to continue every year, in the same spirit of togetherness. In the final get together, Om Gopi VU2EGM was unanimously appointed Gen. Convener for the second in this series - Hamfest 1992. The idea of HF ‘91 General Body was to keep it as an annual South Indian event. As the new Gen. Convener officially took charge, Kerala Amateur Radio Clubs’ Coordination Committee was dissolved.

Early Hamfests

Hamfest ‘92 went on fine at Aluva (near Kochi). The Aluva event still remains as the first model Hamfest. During Hamfest ‘92 days itself, both the upcoming Tamil Nadu and Karnataka Hamfests were sketched. As promised, Tamil Nadu came forward with OM Prem VU2RPC for Hamfest 1993 and Karnataka with OM Madhukar VU2MUD for Hamfest 1994. The Salem Hamfest 1993 also was an unforgettable event managed by OM Premchand VU2RPC. Tamil Nadu celebrated it as a unique state festival! By the time it reached Mysore in 1994 the echo had spread all over the nation and OM Madhukar VU2MUD, the General Convener of the same, had to face new challenges like accommodating more people and ideas. Hamfest became an All Indian Movement when the Mysore Hamfest General Body decided the upcoming Hamfest to be in Mumbai and appointed OM Adolf B Shephard VU2AF as General Convener for the same. The new name ‘Hamfest India’ was decided by the Hamfest ‘93 General Body.

Hamfest India 1995 held in Mumbai was rich with representatives from WPC and ITU. It was organized in the real ambience of a royal hobby. Motivated by the spirit of earlier Hamfests, Kolkata took on Hamfest India 1996, with OM Avinash Misra VU2EM at the helm. It also was a magnificent and an imposing event. From Kolkata the event again came back to Kochi with OM Suresh VU2SUO as Gen. Convener. It still continues its royal journey passing the Official Gavel from one place to another, touching more corners of the nation, with only just one break in 2005.

Breaks

Since the beginning of Hamfests, there had been three breaks, 2005, 2020 and 2021. In 2005, there were no takers and in 2020 conventions/conferences with more than 50 people were not allowed because of the pandemic Covid -19. In 2020, since the event was cancelled and all dues refunded, the organising committee invited bids for the Ham Radio centenary year Hamfest India. The bids received were from Coimbatore and Mysore. The matter was put to online voting [for the first time in the history of Hamfest India] among those who had registered for HFI2020 and Mysore was chosen. HFI 2021 also could not be held due to the same Covid - 19.

Upcoming events
 2022 -Mysore. Dates & Venue

Host cities with Convenors
2022 --  Mysore - Shankar Prasad VU2SPK 
2021 -- NOT HELD
2020 -- NOT HELD
2019 --  Kanyakumari - P A KUMARASAMY RAJA VU2PAJ 
2018 --  Bangalore - Dr S Sathyapal VU2FI,http://hamfestindia2018.com/</ref> 
2017—Kolkata - VU2HRF Mohammad Ariff (16 and 17 December 2017 -)
2016 --  Mount Abu - Yeshwant Patil VU3YOR 
2015 --  Rajkot - S K Nanda, I.A.S SWL 
2014 --  Hyderabad - Ashaar Farhan VU2ESE 
2013 --  Gwalior - Jayant Bide VU2JAU 
2012 --  Chennai - K M Devadas VU2DH 
2011 --  Kochi (Cochin) - K G Girish Babu VU2KGB 
2010 --  Pollachi -  S Vijayan VU2WDP 
2009 --  Bangaluru - M R Sampath Kumar VU2YZ 
2008 --  Gandhinagar - Dr S K Nanda IAS SWL, Secretary to Govt. of Gujarat 
2007 --  Guntur - R Sarath Babu VU2RS 
2006 --  Kollam - K G Nadarajan VU2KGN 
2005 -- NOT HELD
2004 --  Mumbai - Nilesh Rathod VU2NLF 
2003 --  Gandhinagar - S K Nanda IAS SWL 
2002 --  Chennai - M Saravanan VU2MSS 
2001 --  Nagpur - Shrikant Jichkar VU2SJA 
2000 --  Hyderabad - Chalam Chivukula VU2CLM 
1999 --  Mysore - M T Kesari VU2MTK 
1998 --  Bangalore - Ramachandra VU2RCR 
1997 --  Kochi (Cochin) - S Suresh VU2SUO 
1996 --  Kolkata) - Avinash Misra VU2EM 
1995 --  Mumbai - Adolph Shephard VU2AF 
1994 --  Mysore - K R Madhukar VU2MUD 
1993 --  Salem - Premchand K VU2RPC 
1992--  Aluva(Kochi) - K N Gopinadhan VU2EGM 
1991 --  Kuttikkanam (Idukki) - Joseph Mattappally VU2JIM

References

External links
 HAMFEST INDIA - HFI official interactive website
Gujarat Gandhinagar Hamfest of 2008
The Hindu
 HAM RADIO CallSign Directory of India qrz.vu2ukr.com 
 Amateur Radio Social Network (for CallSign Holders)
Hamfest India 2022

Amateur radio in India